The Hillsborough River Formation is a geologic formation in Prince Edward Island. It preserves fossils dating back to the Permian period.

See also

 List of fossiliferous stratigraphic units in Prince Edward Island

References
 

Permian Prince Edward Island